The Government College Women University Faisalabad (GCWUF) is a university located in  Faisalabad, Punjab, Pakistan.

Recognised university
It is an officially recognized university by the Higher Education Commission of Pakistan.

History
The university started its journey as an intermediate college in 1934. It was promoted as a degree college in 1944. The postgraduate disciplines were introduced in 1985. The long journey that starting with the humble beginning reached the uppermost part of its peak when it was granted the status of a university on the 3 January 2013. The university is situated near Jaranwala Road; not very far from the historical clock tower. The university is seeking to fulfill the needs of more than six million people of the city and of equal number from the surrounding districts.

The university is offering various educational degrees in condition of various disciplines. The university is a hub of educational, social and cultural activities having a close relation with business and industrial communities. Including the new campus, the university will have two campuses; the main and the new campus. More than eight thousand students are presently enrolled at GCWUF and this number is expected to be largely increased.

The standard of the university's educational power is the reconstruction of human thought in all its roads on the foundation of social, moral and religious values. University's aim is that they would be grounded in the welfare of both the students and faculty.

Mission
The GCWUF mission is to provide students a free environment where dialogue is encouraged and ideas are imagined. It will provide the intelligence and physical interaction between the students and staff that is applied to students to push them towards the highest moral and ethical values. This university will achieve these goals with the cooperation of public and private organization's and sectors as well as the facility and students of the Government College Women University, Faisalabad.

Programs
The university offers undergraduate and postgraduate programs in the following disciplines:

Arts and humanities
English 
Urdu and Persian 
Education 
Mass Communication
Statistics
Applied Psychology
Geography
Home Economics and Fine arts
History

Business and social sciences
Commerce
Economics

Science and technology
Mathematics
Biology
Chemistry
Bio-Chemistry
Physics
Information Technology

See also
 University of Sahiwal
 Government College Women University, Sialkot
 University of Okara
 Government Sadiq College Women University, Bahawalpur
 Women University Multan

References

External links
 GCWUF official website

1934 establishments in India
Educational institutions established in 1934
Public universities and colleges in Punjab, Pakistan
Universities and colleges in Faisalabad District
Women's universities and colleges in Pakistan